Andorra-Sierra de Arcos is a comarca in Aragon, Spain. It is located in Teruel Province and it is named after Sierra de Arcos, a range of this mountainous area of the Sistema Ibérico.
The capital is Andorra, with 8,156 inhabitants the largest town of the comarca.

Like neighboring Cuencas Mineras, this comarca is part of a traditional mining area. Owing to the unspoilt, spectacular mountain landscapes of the area, tourism is being developed.

Some municipal terms of Andorra-Sierra de Arcos are part of the historical region of Lower Aragon.

Municipal terms
Alacón 
Alloza 
Andorra 
Ariño 
Crivillén 
Ejulve 
Estercuel 
Gargallo 
Oliete

See also
Lower Aragon

References

External links 

 Comarcas de Aragón, Andorra-Sierra de Arcos
CAI Aragon - Andorra-Sierra de Arcos

Comarcas of Aragon
Geography of the Province of Teruel